The High Commissioner of Australia to Pakistan is an officer of the Australian Department of Foreign Affairs and Trade and the head of the High Commission of the Commonwealth of Australia to the Islamic Republic of Pakistan in Islamabad. The High Commissioner has the rank and status of an Ambassador Extraordinary and Plenipotentiary and is currently Neil Hawkins since 6 July 2022. Non-resident accreditation was also previously held for Afghanistan. The High Commission was first established in Karachi in 1948, with John Oldham appointed as Australia's first high commissioner in 1949.

Posting history

On 15 August 1947, the Minister for External Affairs, Herbert Evatt, announced the establishment of diplomatic relations between Australia and Pakistan, with a high commissioner appointed to Karachi. On 8 March 1948, John McMillan arrived in Pakistan as first secretary to establish the new high commission in Karachi. In May 1949, the first high commissioner, John Oldham, took up office.

When the Pakistani Government moved its capital from Karachi to Islamabad in 1966, the Australian High Commission also moved, initially to Rawalpindi from August 1966, and then Islamabad from 1969. When Australia, New Zealand, and the United Kingdom recognised the independence of East Pakistan as the new state of Bangladesh, the President of Pakistan, Zulfikar Ali Bhutto, announced on 30 January 1972 that Pakistan had withdrawn from the Commonwealth of Nations, and the high commissioner was retitled as an ambassador. When Pakistan rejoined the Commonwealth from 1 November 1989, the embassy again became a high commission.

Afghanistan

On 16 December 1968, the Minister for External Affairs, Paul Hasluck, announced the establishment of diplomatic relations between Australia and the Kingdom of Afghanistan, with the High Commissioner to Pakistan receiving non-resident accreditation. The first Australian Ambassador to Afghanistan, Lew Border, formally presented his credentials to King Zahir Shah on 30 March 1969. With the beginning of the Soviet–Afghan War, diplomatic relations with Afghanistan were suspended from on 27 December 1979, with informal connections maintained by the High Commission in Islamabad. Australia and Afghanistan re-established diplomatic representation in 2002, after a long hiatus during conflict in Afghanistan. Between April 2002 and September 2006, Australia's High Commissioner to Pakistan was accredited as non-resident Ambassador to Afghanistan, prior to the appointment of a resident ambassador in Kabul in 2006.

East Pakistan/Bangladesh

In April 1969, a Deputy High Commission (reporting to the High Commission in Islamabad) was opened in the city of Dacca, the capital of East Pakistan. Career diplomat James Lawrence (Jim) Allen, was appointed as Deputy High Commissioner. Australia was one of the first nations to officially recognise Bangladesh as an independent country on 31 January 1972, following the end of the Bangladesh Liberation War on 16 December 1971 and its status as East Pakistan. On 13 March 1972, the former Deputy High Commissioner in Dacca and Chargé d'affaires of the Australian mission since the establishment of diplomatic relations, Jim Allen, was appointed as Australia's first Ambassador to Bangladesh, which was quickly upgraded to the rank of high commissioner following Bangladesh's admission to the Commonwealth of Nations on 18 April 1972.

Heads of mission

Notes
: Also non-resident Ambassador to Afghanistan, 1968–1979 and 2002–2006.

See also
Australia–Pakistan relations

References

External links

Australian High Commission, Pakistan

 
Pakistan
Australia